Frederick Pratten may refer to:

 Frederick Graham Pratten (1899–1977), politician in New South Wales, Australia
 Frederick Pratten (cricketer)  (1904-1967), cricketer who played for Somerset in England